Brinka is an unincorporated place on Bluff Lake on the MacFarlane River in Unorganized Kenora District in northwestern Ontario, Canada.

It lies on the Canadian National Railway transcontinental main line, between Redditt to the west and Farlane to the east, and is passed but not served by Via Rail transcontinental Canadian trains.

References

Communities in Kenora District